The 1927–28 season was the 33rd season of competitive football by Southampton, and the club's sixth in the Second Division of the Football League. The season was the club's worst in the division to date, as they finished in 17th place just two points above Fulham in the first relegation spot. After a poor start in which they lost their first four games of the campaign, the Saints continued to drop points against teams throughout the Second Division, remaining in the bottom six positions for most of the year. A number of wins in the second half of the season over fellow mid-table sides helped to offset notable losses against those aiming for promotion, ensuring that the club avoided returning down to the Third Division South. Southampton finished the season in 17th place with 14 wins, seven draws and 21 losses.

In the 1927–28 FA Cup, Southampton entered at the third round away to First Division side Cardiff City, who had beaten Arsenal to win the tournament the previous season. The game ended 2–1 to the Welsh side, with Bill Rawlings scoring a consolation goal for visitors as they were eliminated in their first fixture in the cup for the second time in three seasons. The club ended the season at Fratton Park for the Hampshire Benevolent Cup match against local rivals Portsmouth, who had just completed their first year as a top-flight side. Pompey thrashed the Saints 6–1, with Charlie Petrie scoring the sole goal for the visitors. Southampton also played five friendly matches during the season, losing to Bournemouth & Boscombe Athletic, Corinthian and Millwall, and drawing with Guildford City and Wimborne Town.

Southampton used 27 different players during the 1927–28 season and had twelve different goalscorers. Their top-scorer was centre-forward Bill Rawlings, in his final season with the club, who scored 20 goals in the Second Division and one in the FA Cup. Sam Taylor scored ten goals in the league, followed by Jimmy Bullock with eight league goals. Jerry Mackie, who joined the club in March 1928 after Rawlings left for Manchester United, scored six goals in his seven league appearances. Eight players were signed by the club during the campaign, with four released and sold to other clubs. The average attendance at The Dell during the 1927–28 season was 10,309. The highest attendance was 15,763 against West Bromwich Albion on 9 April 1928; the lowest was 4,619 against Fulham on 19 November 1927.

Background and transfers
Southampton manager Arthur Chadwick signed several new players after the end of the 1926–27 season. The first addition was right-back James Ellison, who joined on amateur terms in May from Welsh club Rhyl United, before signing a professional contract in October. The following month the club signed half-back Jack Mitton from Wolverhampton Wanderers for £150, and inside-forward Charlie Petrie from Swindon Town. Five more players arrived at The Dell in August: wing-half Bill Luckett from Liverpool County Combination side Skelmersdale United, full-back Ted Robinson from Lancashire Combination side Chorley, inside-forward Tommy Taylor from Manchester City, goalkeeper George Thompson from Midland League club York City, and half-back Arthur Wilson from Scotswood.

During the summer, goalkeeper James Thitchener left the club for Peterborough-based side Celta Mills. Also departing the club were right-half Ernie King, who signed for Southern League side Guildford City, and inside-left Frank Matthews, who joined Third Division North club Chesterfield. Shortly before the end of the season, in March 1928, centre-forward Bill Rawlings left the club to join First Division side Manchester United for a new club record fee of £3,860. In a nine-year career at Southampton, Rawlings made a total of 377 appearances and scored 198 goals in all competitions, making him the club's top scorer at the time. To replace their top scorer, the Saints signed Jerry Mackie from local First Division rivals Portsmouth, who introduced himself by scoring a hat-trick on his debut.

Players transferred in

Players transferred out

Second Division

Southampton's campaign in the 1927–28 Football League Second Division started with four straight losses, combining with the defeat on the last day of the previous season to mark their joint longest run of losses in league football. The first game of the season was a 6–3 loss at home to Stoke City on 27 August 1927, who had been recently promoted to the Second Division as Third Division North champions. Bill Rawlings (twice) and Sam Taylor scored for the home side in the club's highest-scoring draw to date. The next three matches saw the Saints lose 2–0 away to Clapton Orient and Leeds United, and 3–1 in the return fixture against Orient at The Dell, leaving the team in 20th place in the Second Division table. A 5–2 win over Oldham Athletic and three draws saw Southampton move up three places in the standings to 17th by October, although by the next month they were back in close proximity to the relegation zone following defeats against Blackpool, Chelsea, Port Vale and South Shields.

The club continued to struggle throughout November and December, when they remained in the bottom six of the table facing the prospect of a battle against relegation. Fortunes began to turn in late January when the Saints beat Notts County 5–1 (in which debutant Bill Luckett scored twice), followed by a 5–0 defeat of Grimsby Town and 2–0 victories over Blackpool and Chelsea in February, all of which combined to help the side escape the bottom six for the first time during the campaign. The remaining fixtures of the season saw Southampton pick up enough wins to remain out of the relegation zone and therefore safe in the second flight. Notable games included a 6–1 victory over Barnsley in which new signing Jerry Mackie scored a hat-trick on his debut, and a 2–1 away win over promotion hopefuls Preston North End. The Saints finished the season in 17th place in the Second Division league table – their lowest position in their six seasons in the division to date – with 14 wins, seven draws and 21 losses.

List of match results

Final league table

Results by matchday

FA Cup

Southampton entered the 1927–28 FA Cup in the third round against defending champions Cardiff City, who had beaten Southampton's semi-final opponents Arsenal in the final the previous year. The meeting took place on 14 January 1928 at Ninian Park, marking the first time the Saints had been drawn into the tournament away from home since the 1923–24 season. The Second Division side put up "a good show", but lost 2–1 to the top-flight Bluebirds. Bill Rawlings scored the only goal for the visitors, which marked his final cup goal for the club before leaving in March.

Other matches
Outside of the league and the FA Cup, Southampton played six additional first-team matches during the 1927–28 season. The first was a friendly match against local side Bournemouth & Boscombe Athletic on 28 September 1927, which they lost 3–1. In January the Saints travelled to face amateur club Corinthian, who thrashed them 5–0. Two away friendlies in April ended in draws: Arthur Wilson scored twice alongside Bert Shelley in a 3–3 draw against Southern League side Guildford City, and a week later a 2–2 draw with Dorset League side Wimborne Town included goals from Fred Lohse and Shelley. A final friendly took place against Millwall at The Dell on 2 May. A benefit for Michael Keeping and Ted Hough, it ended in a 2–1 win for the visitors, with Southampton's consolation scored by Jim Swinden.

Five days after the loss to Millwall, Southampton ended their season at Fratton Park with the annual Hampshire Benevolent Cup fixture against local rivals Portsmouth. The home side took the lead in the first minute through a header from Jack Weddle, with a Bobby Irvine volley doubling their advantage and Dave Watson adding a third before half-time. After Weddle scored a second and third goal after the break, Charlie Petrie pulled one back for the travelling Saints, although the Pompey forward later scored his fourth and his side's sixth to secure a 6–1 victory. For the first time since its introduction in the 1922–23 season, the Rowland Hospital Cup was not contested between the sides in 1927–28, with a local newspaper explaining that "Southampton could not find it convenient to field a team" for the fixture.

Player details
Southampton used 27 different players during the 1927–28 season, twelve of whom scored during the campaign. The team played in a 2–3–5 formation throughout the campaign, using two full-backs, three half-backs, two outside forwards, two inside forwards and a centre-forward. Half-back and captain George Harkus made the most appearances during the season, playing in all but one league match. Arthur Bradford and Stan Woodhouse appeared in all but six games in the league. Centre-forward Bill Rawlings finished as the season's top scorer with 20 goals in the Second Division and one in the FA Cup. Jimmy Bullock was the second-highest scorer of the season, with eight goals in 17 league appearances. The highest-scoring half-back of the season was new signing Bill Luckett, who scored twice in the league.

Squad statistics

Most appearances

Top goalscorers

Footnotes

References

Bibliography

External links
Southampton F.C. official website

Southampton F.C. seasons
Southampton